Heroes of the Realm was a 2D side-scrolling massively multiplayer online role-playing game, developed by South Korean studio Bluceansoft. It combined a collectible card game with a turn-based strategy game in a fantasy world. It was shut down by its publisher OGPlanet on the 25 July 2015.

External links 
 Official Heroes of the Realm website

2012 video games
Windows games
Windows-only games
Fantasy massively multiplayer online role-playing games
Massively multiplayer online role-playing games
Inactive massively multiplayer online games
Video games developed in South Korea
OGPlanet games